Topolovgrad Municipality is a municipality (obshtina) in Haskovo Province, Southeastern Bulgaria. It is named after its administrative centre - the town of Topolovgrad.

The municipality has a territory of 710.9 km² with a population of 11,681 inhabitants, according to the 2011 census. The municipality is located mostly on the right bank of the Tundzha river, with the Sakar mountain taking up a large part of its territory. Topolovgrad municipality has a short border with Turkey to the south.

Settlements 
Topolovgrad Municipality includes the following 21 places (towns are shown in bold):

Demography 
The following table shows the change of the population during the last four decades.

Ethnic composition
According to the 2011 census, among those who answered the optional question on ethnic identification, the ethnic composition of the municipality was the following:

Religion
According to the latest Bulgarian census of 2011, the religious composition, among those who answered the optional question on religious identification, was the following:

See also
Provinces of Bulgaria
Municipalities of Bulgaria
List of cities and towns in Bulgaria

References

External links
 Official website 

Municipalities in Haskovo Province